One Fine Day is a German rock band from Hamburg, Germany. The band has charted at the national charts once.

Band members
 Hendrik - Guitars
 Marten - Vocals
 Marco - Bass
 Erik - Drums

Former band members
 Roman - Guitars

References

External links
 Official website

German rock music groups